Futebol Clube da Pampilhosa is a Portuguese football club in Pampilhosa, Mealhada, district of Aveiro.

Current squad

Association football clubs established in 1930
Football clubs in Portugal
1930 establishments in Portugal